Joseph Indrias Rehmat (born 1 July 1966) is the Roman Catholic Bishop of Faisalabad in Pakistan.
 
On June 29, 2019 Pope Francis appointed Father Joseph Indrias Rehmat, of the Diocese of Faisalabad, currently Dean of the National Catholic Institute of Theology, as Bishop of the Roman Catholic Diocese of Faisalabad.

He was born on 1 July 1966 in Okara. He began his education at St. Albert High School in Gojra city.
He entered the St. Thomas the Apostle Minor Seminary and he completed his studies at the Christ the King major Seminary in 1992. He was ordained a priest on 25 September 1992 for the diocese of Faisalabad. In 2000 he obtained a Doctorate in Moral Theology at the Alphonsian Academy in Rome.

Since his ordination he has had the following appointments: 1992-1995 Parish priest at Chak 424, in Faisalabad; since 2000, Professor of moral theology at the National Catholic Institute of Theology; 2000-2006, Professor at the Christ the King Major Seminary in Karachi; 2006-2008, priest in the diocese of Hyderabad; 2009-2014, parish priest of the Sacred Heart parish in Karachi; since 2014, Dean of the National Catholic Institute of Theology in Karachi 

Bishop Rehmat replaces Archbishop Joseph Arshad who was transferred to the Islamabad-Rawalpindi Diocese in December 2017.

Bishop Rehmat has already begun to represent the diocese by participating in the delegation from the Pakistan Catholic Bishops' Conference which met Prime Minister Imran Khan on July 4, 2019, with a donation on behalf of the Catholic community.

He was ordained bishop on 13 September 2019 at La Salle High School Faisalabad. The Principal Consecrator was Joseph Cardinal Coutts, Archbishop of Karachi and his  Co-Consecrators were Archbishop Christophe Zakhia El-Kassis, Apostolic Nuncio and Archbishop Joseph Arshad, Bishop of Islamabad-Rawalpindi.

References

External links

1966 births
Living people
21st-century Roman Catholic bishops in Pakistan
People from Faisalabad
Pakistani Roman Catholic bishops
Roman Catholic bishops of Faisalabad